Archibald Blue (born 8 April 1940) is a footballer, who played as a centre forward in the Football League during the 1960s, before moving to Australia and playing international football for them.

Playing career

Club career
He was born in Glasgow and played in his youth with Royal Albert. He moved to senior football with Hearts, but did not play a league game for them.

He then transferred to Exeter City and played for them between 1961 and 1962, before a transfer to Carlisle United for the 1962–63 season, although he only made 2 appearances for the club.

Blue then moved to Australia and played for the Footscray JUST club, and later APIA.

International career
He was capped by the Australia national football team on 12 occasions, 10 in full internationals, and scored 4 goals, including a hat-trick in a 3–1 victory over China in 1965.

References

External links
 Newspaper report of his appearance in Australia squad in 1968

Scottish footballers
Australia international soccer players
Australian soccer players
English Football League players
Heart of Midlothian F.C. players
Exeter City F.C. players
Carlisle United F.C. players
Footscray JUST players
APIA Leichhardt FC players
Living people
1940 births
Royal Albert F.C. players
Footballers from Glasgow
Scottish emigrants to Australia
Association football forwards
Scotland junior international footballers
Scottish Junior Football Association players